Serge Dieudonne Aubry (January 2, 1942 – October 30, 2011) was a professional ice hockey goaltender who played 142 games in the World Hockey Association and an NHL coach.

Aubry was born in Montreal, Quebec.  He played with the Quebec Nordiques  and Cincinnati Stingers. During a five-season career, Aubry posted a record of 65-53-5, with five shutouts. His best season came during his rookie year in 1972-73, when he compiled a 25-22-3 record, with two shutouts. His goals-against average that season was the best of his career at 3.59. Aubry later served as the NHL Nordiques' goalie coach during the 1988-89 season and as a scout for the Los Angeles Kings.

On October 30, 2011, Aubry died in a Lévis, Quebec hospital from diabetes.

References

External links 

1942 births
2011 deaths
Canadian ice hockey goaltenders
Cincinnati Stingers players
Deaths from diabetes
Los Angeles Kings scouts
Quebec Nordiques coaches
Quebec Nordiques (WHA) players
Ice hockey people from Montreal
Canadian ice hockey coaches